Bondar (Cyrillic: Бондар, Бондарь) is a common surname of East Slavic origin meaning "cooper" (barrel maker). It may refer to following people which first name starts with:

Aleksandr Bondar (disambiguation), several people
Alexander Bondar, former executive director, Eurasian Scout Region (World Organization of the Scout Movement)
Andriy Bondar, Ukrainian writer
Dani Bondar, Israeli footballer
Iana Bondar, Ukrainian biathlete
Ihor Bondar, Ukrainian journalist, murdered in 1999 
Oleksandr Bondar, Ukrainian politician
Oleksandr Bondar, Ukrainian Olympic diver
Roberta Bondar, Canadian astronaut
Valeriy Bondar, Ukrainian footballer
Vladyslav Bondar, Ukrainian footballer
Volodymyr Bondar, Ukrainian politician, Governor of Volyn Oblast
Viktor Bondar, Ukrainian politician and statesman, Minister of Transport and Communication
Simon Bondar, British Musician & Art Director

See also
 

Ukrainian-language surnames
Russian-language surnames
Belarusian-language surnames
Occupational surnames
East Slavic-language surnames